Paul Kempeneers (born in Tienen on December 9, 1935) is a Belgian philologist and linguist.

As a teacher, he published mostly didactic works, such as guides to correct Dutch, books about Dutch spelling and Dutch grammar. In 1970 he wrote a science fiction novel for children, named "Phantoms from space".

In 1982, he was promoted to doctor in the philology of Germanic languages, with an essay on the hydronymy of the rivers Dijle and Nete.  He became the principal of a school for adult education in 1984.

From the second half of the seventies on, he mainly wrote books and publications about the history of the municipality Tienen. During the 90s, he also covered the history of surrounding cities in the province of Flemish Brabant, such as Landen, Zoutleeuw, and parts of Linter.

Publications
School publications (didactic works concerning Dutch)
 Tijd voor taal
 Tips voor taalzuivering
 ABN-gids
 Elementaire begrippen uit de Nederlandse taalkunde
 Didactiek van het Nederlands
 Spelen met spelling
 Nederlandse Spraakkunst en Oefeningen
 ABN-tips

Series Toponymica, K.U.Leuven (historical books)
 Hakendover IX, 5
 Kumtich IX, 6
 Oplinter IX, 7
 Waanrode IX, 8
 Goetsenhoven IX, 9
 Oorbeek IX, 10
 Orsmaal-Gussenhoven en Melkwezer IX, 11
 Naamkunde, register 1969-1993
 
Series Nomina geographica flandrica, K.U.Leuven (historical books)
 Hoegaardse Plaatsnamen, XV
 Leven in Landen, XVII
 Zoutleeuw, XIX
 
Royal Commission for Toponymy and Dialectology, Brussels (historical books)
 Toponymie van Orsmaal-Gussenhoven & Melkwezer
 Toponymie van Budingen
 Toponymie van Helen-Bos
 Toponymie van Vissenaken
 
Works of the Hagelands Historisch Documentatiecentrum (historical books)
 Cijnsboek van de hertog van Brabant in Tienen vernieuwd in 1699
 Klapper op het bevolkingsregister (1866–1890)
 Het oudste cijnsboek van Tienen (+ kroniekje G. Cluckers)
 
Other publications (various, mainly historical books and books about dialects)
 Hydronymie van het Dijle- en Netebekken
 Schimmen uit de ruimte
 Tienen in Verbeelding
 Oost-Brabantse Historische Teksten
 Esperanto voor moderne mensen
 Paaseiland
 De Brabantse Folklore register 1961-1996
 Aren lezen aan de Gete
 Diverse notabele dingen
 Pito, roman van een school
 Reddelen onder de boompjes
 Tienen in vroeger tijden
 Tiense Plaatsnamen
 Thuis in Thienen
 Tiens en Hoegaards Idioticon
 Toponymie van Sint-Margriet Houtem

Appears in 2007
 Oud Schrift. Lezen, begrijpen, overzetten

External links

1935 births
Living people
Linguists from Belgium
Belgian philologists
People from Tienen